The 1995–96 Courage League Division 4 was the ninth full season of rugby union within the fourth tier of the English league system, currently the regional divisions National League 2 South and National League 2 North, and the third using the name Division 4.  Impending changes to the league structure by the RFU meant that this would be the last season for Courage League Division 4 as a national league with it reverting to the previous incarnation of two regional leagues - Courage League Division 4 South and Courage League Division 4 North.  It would also herald the elimination of Courage League 5 North and South, which was to be divided into four regional divisions - North 1, Midlands 1, London 1 and South West 1.  These changes meant that the top 8 teams would be promoted to an expanded Courage League National 3 while the bottom teams would be transferred into the new-look Courage 4 North or South depending on location, where they would be joined by teams from the discontinued Courage 5 North/South divisions.

By the end of the campaign Exeter finished as champions, 4 points ahead of runners up London Welsh.  Both champions and runners up were joined by the teams ranked 3rd through to 8th in claiming promotion to the 1996–97 National Division 3.  The bottom two sides were Plymouth Albion and Aspatria who would be transferred to National Division 4 South and National Division 4 North respectively.

Structure
Each team played home and away matches against each of the other teams, playing a total of eighteen matches each. Changes to the league structure by the RFU for the 1996-97 season meant that the top eight sides were promoted to Courage League National 3 while the bottom two were transferred to the new-look Courage League Division 4 South or Courage League Division 4 North depending on locality.

Participating teams and locations

League table

Sponsorship
Courage League Division 4 is part of the Courage Clubs Championship and is sponsored by Courage Brewery.

Notes

References

N4
National League 2 North
National League 2 South